Pryberezhne or Pribryezhnoye() is a village in the Sudak Municipality of the Crimea, a territory recognized by a majority of countries as part of Ukraine and annexed by Russia as the Republic of Crimea.

Its population was 3 in the 2001 Ukrainian census. Current population:

References

Villages in Crimea
Sudak Municipality
Populated coastal places in Ukraine